Robert Sproul may refer to:
 R. C. Sproul (1939–2017), American Calvinist theologian
 R. C. Sproul Jr. (born 1965), Calvinist Christian minister and son of R. C. Sproul
 Robert Gordon Sproul (1891–1975), eleventh President of the University of California
 Robert C. Sproul, founder of Major Publications

See also
Robert Sproull (1918–2014), American physicist and president of the University of Rochester 
Robert Sproule (1881–1948), Australian politician
Sproul (disambiguation)